Daniel Staniszewski (born 5 May 1997) is a Polish cyclist, who currently rides for UCI Continental team .

Major results

Track

2014
 2nd  Individual pursuit, UEC European Junior Championships
2015
 UEC European Junior Championships
1st  Individual pursuit
3rd  Team pursuit
 National Championships
1st  Individual pursuit
1st  Scratch
2016
 National Championships
1st  Madison (with Norbert Banaszek)
2nd Individual pursuit
 2nd Individual pursuit, UCI World Cup, Glasgow
 3rd  Madison (with Alan Banaszek), UEC European Under-23 Track Championships
2017
 National Championships
1st  Madison (with Wojciech Pszczolarski)
1st  Individual pursuit
2nd Omnium
3rd Team pursuit
 3rd   Madison (with Wojciech Pszczolarski), UEC European Championships
 UEC European Under-23 Championships
3rd  Individual pursuit
3rd  Team pursuit
 3rd Madison (with Wojciech Pszczolarski), UCI World Cup, Manchester
2018
 2nd Madison (with Wojciech Pszczolarski), UCI World Cup, Saint-Quentin-en-Yvelines
 National Championships
3rd Madison
3rd Team pursuit
2019
 1st  Madison (with Filip Prokopyszyn), National Championships
 2nd Omnium, UCI World Cup, Milton
 3rd  Omnium, European Games
2020
 1st  Individual pursuit, National Championships
2021
 National Championships
1st  Madison (with Alan Banaszek)
1st  Team pursuit
2022
 1st  Elimination race, National Championships

Road
2015
 3rd Time trial, National Junior Road Championships

References

External links

1997 births
Living people
Polish male cyclists
Polish track cyclists
People from Ciechanów
Sportspeople from Masovian Voivodeship
Cyclists at the 2019 European Games
European Games medalists in cycling
European Games bronze medalists for Poland
Olympic cyclists of Poland
Cyclists at the 2020 Summer Olympics